James Hildreth (born 1984) is an English cricketer.

James Hildreth may also refer to:

 James R. Hildreth (born 1927), United States Air Force general
 James E. K. Hildreth (born 1956), American immunologist and academic administrator
James Hildreth (born 1812?) A personal diary of a U.S. Dragoon; "Dragoon Campaigns to the Rocky Mountains Being a History of the Enlistment, Organization, and first Campaigns of the Regiment of UNITED STATES DRAGOONS." By A Dragoon, New York: Wiley & Long, No. 161 Broadway.  (1836).  D. Fanshaw, Printer.